Gyeongju Ping clan is one of the Korean clans. Their Bon-gwan is in Gyeongju, North Gyeongsang Province. According to the research held in 2000, the number of Gyeongju Ping clan’s member was 722. Their founder was  who was from Ming dynasty.  passed Imperial examination and worked as Grand Scholar of Wenyuan Cabinet and munha sirang pyeongjangsa (문하시랑평장사; 門下侍郞平章事). After that, when  worked as Hanlin Academy, he went to Joseon and was naturalized in Korea. Sejo of Joseon treated  as a national guest and appointed him as Prince of Gyeongju.

See also 
 Korean clan names of foreign origin

References

External links 
 

Bing clans
Korean clan names of Chinese origin